Corvos is a Portuguese band. Corvos is unusual within the Portuguese music scene as it consists of a string quartet that plays mostly rock songs. Corvos mixes instrumental elements, classical origins, rock, contemporary pop music and other musical genres. 

Corvos is Portuguese for crows.

Members
It is a string quartet constituted by Pedro Teixeira da Silva (violin), Tiago Flores (violin) and Luis Santos (viola). With the release of their fourth album, The Jinx, Corvos included a drummer in its lineup.

Discography 
Singles
 Futuro que era Brilhante (2001)

Albums
 Corvos Visitam Xutos (1999)
 Post Scriptum (2001)
 Corvos 3 (2003)
 The Jinx (2007)
 Medo (2010)

References 

On the Portuguese Wikipedia: Corvos (banda).

External links 

Myspace profile

Portuguese musical groups